Daniel, Danny or Dan Wilson may refer to:

Sports
 Dan Wilson (Negro leagues) (1915–1986), American Negro leagues baseball player
 Dan Wilson (catcher) (born 1969), American baseball catcher
 Danny Wilson (rugby) (born 1955), Welsh rugby union, and rugby league footballer, and father of Ryan Giggs
 Danny Wilson (rugby union) (born 1976), rugby union coach
 Danny Wilson (footballer, born 1960), English-born Northern Irish footballer and manager
 Danny Wilson (cricketer) (born 1977), former English cricketer
 Danny Wilson (footballer, born 1991), Scottish footballer
 Dany Wilson (1982–2011), Jamaican beach volleyball and volleyball player
 Daniel Wilson (footballer, born 1993), Guyanese footballer

Politicians
 Daniel Wilson (MP) (1680–1754), member of parliament for Westmorland constituency
 Daniel Martin Wilson (1862–1932), Irish politician and judge

Musicians
 Dan Wilson (musician) (born 1961), American guitarist and vocalist, frontman for the band Semisonic
 Dan Wilson, British musician, instrument builder and composer better known as Meadow House
 Dan Wilson, English musician, lead singer of  London band Televised Crimewave and formerly of Black Wire
 Danny Wilson, country rock musician in Grand Drive and Danny and the Champions of the World
 Danny Wilson (band), a Scottish band
 Meet Danny Wilson, the first album by the band
 Daniel Wilson (musician) (born 1990), American singer, songwriter and producer

Others
 Dan Wilson (biologist), American biologist and science communicator
 Dan Wilson (playwright) (born 1970), American playwright, director and actor
 Daniel Wilson (academic) (1816–1892), British-Canadian archaeologist, ethnologist and author
 Daniel Wilson (bishop) (1778–1858), Bishop of Calcutta
 Daniel H. Wilson (born 1978), American writer and robotics engineer
 Daniel Wilson, American film producer best known for his production of The Handmaid's Tale
 Meet Danny Wilson (film), a 1952 film starring Frank Sinatra
 The brother of television character James Wilson (House)